Richard R. Neely is a United States Air Force officer and the 40th Adjutant general of Illinois.

Career 

Neely was appointed the 40th Illinois Adjutant General by Governor JB Pritzker and assumed those duties on February 15, 2019.

Neely's prior assignment was Air National Guard principal deputy director for operations and deputy director for cyber and space operations at Joint Base Andrews in Maryland.

Neely began his career as an enlisted Soldier in the Army Reserves and later joined the Air National Guard as an Airman.  He received his officer's commission in 1990.

On November 18, 2020, Neely was nominated for federal recognition and United States Senate confirmation of his promotion to major general by Governor Pritzker on October 1, 2020. His promotion was confirmed by voice vote of the Senate on December 14, 2020.

Dates of Rank

References

External links
Adjutant General, Illinois National Guard; Director, Department of Military Affairs

Year of birth missing (living people)
Living people
Illinois State University alumni
National Defense University alumni
Adjutants General of Illinois
National Guard (United States) generals